Hannes Pétursson (born 14 December 1931) is an Icelandic poet and writer who has authored a number of books of poetry and other works and received many awards. He is amongst the most widely translated of living Icelandic poets. He is a recipient of the German Henrik Steffens Prize in 1975 and the Icelandic Literary Prize for his poetry collection Eldhylur in 1993.

Biography
He was 23 years old when he published his first book of poetry, Kvæðabók, which attracted attention. By 1966 he had already established himself as one of Iceland's leading poets.

Hannes has authored collections of poetry, fiction, narrative elements, short stories and travelogues, a book about the poet Steingrímur Thorsteinsson, a reference work on literature, and many translations. He was awarded the Icelandic Literary Prize for his poetry collection Eldhylur in 1993 and the German Henrik Steffens Prize in 1975. A writer in World Literature Today said of him when he won the Icelandic Literary Prize, "Hannes Petursson has long been one of Iceland's most eminent poets, yet he has never done better than now. His craft is without blemish." He is an honorary Writer of Iceland. His poetry has been translated into 12 languages.

Style
Most of his works of poetry are free-form, with many references to national traditions, legends and cultural heritage, national song and folklore. Encyclopædia Britannica says that "early works of Hannes Pétursson show great sensitivity and skill in adapting Icelandic to new, European metres. Pétursson’s later poems (such as those in the collection Ur hugskoti [1976; “Recollections”]) reveal a movement away from innovative forms to [the] more traditional."

, which have a characteristic form and style, chronicle historical events in a particular place, based on oral histories or written accounts.

Selected works
 , 1955.
  (In summer valleys), 1959.
  (Time and places), 1962.
 , 1964.
 , 1965.
 , 1968.
  (Pages of rhyme), 1971.
  1.-2., 1973-1976.
 , 1973.
 , 1974.
 , 1976.
 , 1978.
 , 1979.
 , 1983.
 , 1990.
 , 1991.
  (Fire Pit), 1993.
 , 2006.

Prose
  (Stories from the North), 1961. 
  (Letters Of Poetry), 1973.
  1.-3., 1982-1987.

References

Hannes Petursson
Hannes Petursson
Hannes Petursson
1931 births
Living people
Hannes Petursson
Hannes Petursson
Hannes Petursson
20th-century male writers